The 1984–85 New Jersey Nets season was the Nets' ninth season in the NBA.

Draft picks

Roster

Regular season

Season standings

Record vs. opponents

Game log

Regular season

|- align="center" bgcolor="#ffcccc"
| 1
| October 26, 1984
| Atlanta
| L 104–119
|
|
|
| Brendan Byrne Arena
| 0–1
|- align="center" bgcolor="#ccffcc"
| 2
| October 27, 1984
| @ Cleveland
| W 131–106
|
|
|
| Richfield Coliseum
| 1–1
|- align="center" bgcolor="#ffcccc"
| 3
| October 30, 1984
| Philadelphia
| L 96–118
|
|
|
| Brendan Byrne Arena
| 1–2
|- align="center" bgcolor="#ffcccc"
| 4
| October 31, 1984
| @ Boston
| L 105–116
|
|
|
| Boston Garden
| 1–3

|- align="center" bgcolor="#ccffcc"
| 5
| November 3, 1984
| Indiana
| W 118–117
|
|
|
| Brendan Byrne Arena
| 2–3
|- align="center" bgcolor="#ccffcc"
| 6
| November 7, 1984
| Washington
| W 99–88
|
|
|
| Brendan Byrne Arena
| 3–3
|- align="center" bgcolor="#ffcccc"
| 7
| November 9, 1984
| Kansas City
| L 99–101
|
|
|
| Brendan Byrne Arena
| 3–4
|- align="center" bgcolor="#ffcccc"
| 8
| November 11, 198410:30p.m. EST
| @ L.A. Lakers
| L 111–121
| King (22)
| Williams (10)
| Richardson (8)
| The Forum13,257
| 3–5
|- align="center" bgcolor="#ccffcc"
| 9
| November 13, 1984
| @ L.A. Clippers
| W 99–90
|
|
|
| Los Angeles Memorial Sports Arena
| 4–5
|- align="center" bgcolor="#ffcccc"
| 10
| November 14, 1984
| @ Phoenix
| L 86–98
|
|
|
| Arizona Veterans Memorial Coliseum
| 4–6
|- align="center" bgcolor="#ccffcc"
| 11
| November 17, 1984
| @ Golden State
| W 131–114
|
|
|
| Oakland-Alameda County Coliseum Arena
| 5–6
|- align="center" bgcolor="#ccffcc"
| 12
| November 18, 1984
| @ Seattle
| W 102–97
|
|
|
| Kingdome
| 6–6
|- align="center" bgcolor="#ffcccc"
| 13
| November 20, 1984
| @ Portland
| L 107–117 (OT)
|
|
|
| Memorial Coliseum
| 6–7
|- align="center" bgcolor="#ffcccc"
| 14
| November 24, 1984
| @ Atlanta
| L 99–101
|
|
|
| The Omni
| 6–8
|- align="center" bgcolor="#ccffcc"
| 15
| November 28, 1984
| New York
| W 111–96
|
|
|
| Brendan Byrne Arena
| 7–8
|- align="center" bgcolor="#ccffcc"
| 16
| November 30, 1984
| Indiana
| W 123–100
|
|
|
| Brendan Byrne Arena
| 8–8

|- align="center" bgcolor="#ffcccc"
| 17
| December 2, 1984
| @ Philadelphia
| L 112–114
|
|
|
| The Spectrum
| 8–9
|- align="center" bgcolor="#ffcccc"
| 18
| December 4, 1984
| @ Chicago
| L 97–112
|
|
|
| Chicago Stadium
| 8–10
|- align="center" bgcolor="#ffcccc"
| 19
| December 5, 19847:30p.m. EST
| L.A. Lakers
| L 93–104
| Birdsong (26)
| Sappleton (11)
| Richardson (11)
| Brendan Byrne Arena14,532
| 8–11
|- align="center" bgcolor="#ffcccc"
| 20
| December 8, 1984
| Boston
| L 98–107
|
|
|
| Brendan Byrne Arena
| 8–12
|- align="center" bgcolor="#ffcccc"
| 21
| December 11, 1984
| @ Boston
| L 121–130
|
|
|
| Hartford Civic Center
| 8–13
|- align="center" bgcolor="#ccffcc"
| 22
| December 12, 1984
| Milwaukee
| W 116–109
|
|
|
| Brendan Byrne Arena
| 9–13
|- align="center" bgcolor="#ccffcc"
| 23
| December 14, 1984
| Chicago
| W 111–109
|
|
|
| Brendan Byrne Arena
| 10–13
|- align="center" bgcolor="#ffcccc"
| 24
| December 15, 1984
| @ Indiana
| L 100–112
|
|
|
| Market Square Arena
| 10–14
|- align="center" bgcolor="#ffcccc"
| 25
| December 18, 1984
| @ Washington
| L 95–104
|
|
|
| Capital Centre
| 10–15
|- align="center" bgcolor="#ccffcc"
| 26
| December 19, 1984
| Washington
| W 115–106
|
|
|
| Brendan Byrne Arena
| 11–15
|- align="center" bgcolor="#ffcccc"
| 27
| December 21, 1984
| San Antonio
| L 116–122
|
|
|
| Brendan Byrne Arena
| 11–16
|- align="center" bgcolor="#ffcccc"
| 28
| December 22, 1984
| @ Philadelphia
| L 93–107
|
|
|
| The Spectrum
| 11–17
|- align="center" bgcolor="#ccffcc"
| 29
| December 25, 1985
| @ New York
| W 120–114
|
|
|
| Madison Square Garden
| 12–17
|- align="center" bgcolor="#ccffcc"
| 30
| December 26, 1984
| Detroit
| W 112–97
|
|
|
| Brendan Byrne Arena
| 13–17
|- align="center" bgcolor="#ccffcc"
| 31
| December 28, 1984
| New York
| W 100–97
|
|
|
| Brendan Byrne Arena
| 14–17
|- align="center" bgcolor="#ccffcc"
| 32
| December 29, 1984
| @ Detroit
| W 110–108
|
|
|
| Pontiac Silverdome
| 15–17

|- align="center" bgcolor="#ffcccc"
| 33
| January 2, 1985
| Boston
| L 95–110
|
|
|
| Brendan Byrne Arena
| 15–18
|- align="center" bgcolor="#ccffcc"
| 34
| January 4, 1985
| Phoenix
| W 105–98
|
|
|
| Brendan Byrne Arena
| 16–18
|- align="center" bgcolor="#ffcccc"
| 35
| January 5, 1985
| @ Atlanta
| L 114–124
|
|
|
| The Omni
| 16–19
|- align="center" bgcolor="#ffcccc"
| 36
| January 8, 1985
| @ Cleveland
| L 101–107
|
|
|
| Richfield Coliseum
| 16–20
|- align="center" bgcolor="#ccffcc"
| 37
| January 11, 1985
| Atlanta
| W 122–103
|
|
|
| Brendan Byrne Arena
| 17–20
|- align="center" bgcolor="#ccffcc"
| 38
| January 13, 1985
| Houston
| W 100–99
|
|
|
| Brendan Byrne Arena
| 18–20
|- align="center" bgcolor="#ccffcc"
| 39
| January 16, 1985
| Chicago
| W 100–94
|
|
|
| Brendan Byrne Arena
| 19–20
|- align="center" bgcolor="#ffcccc"
| 40
| January 18, 1985
| @ Milwaukee
| L 93–102
|
|
|
| MECCA Arena
| 19–21
|- align="center" bgcolor="#ffcccc"
| 41
| January 19, 1985
| Detroit
| L 107–109
|
|
|
| Brendan Byrne Arena
| 19–22
|- align="center" bgcolor="#ffcccc"
| 42
| January 22, 1985
| @ Utah
| L 99–102
|
|
|
| Salt Palace Acord Arena
| 19–23
|- align="center" bgcolor="#ffcccc"
| 43
| January 24, 1985
| @ Denver
| L 110–119
|
|
|
| McNichols Sports Arena
| 19–24
|- align="center" bgcolor="#ccffcc"
| 44
| January 26, 1985
| @ Dallas
| W 103–93
|
|
|
| Reunion Arena
| 20–24
|- align="center" bgcolor="#ffcccc"
| 45
| January 28, 1985
| @ Houston
| L 93–97
|
|
|
| The Summit
| 20–25
|- align="center" bgcolor="#ffcccc"
| 46
| January 29, 1985
| @ San Antonio
| L 127–130
|
|
|
| HemisFair Arena
| 20–26
|- align="center" bgcolor="#ccffcc"
| 47
| January 31, 1985
| L.A. Clippers
| W 122–99
|
|
|
| Brendan Byrne Arena
| 21–26

|- align="center" bgcolor="#ccffcc"
| 48
| February 2, 1985
| Philadelphia
| W 101–96
|
|
|
| Brendan Byrne Arena
| 22–26
|- align="center" bgcolor="#ccffcc"
| 49
| February 5, 1985
| @ Detroit
| W 119–117
|
|
|
| Pontiac Silverdome
| 23–26
|- align="center" bgcolor="#ccffcc"
| 50
| February 6, 1985
| Milwaukee
| W 106–93
|
|
|
| Brendan Byrne Arena
| 24–26
|- align="center"
|colspan="9" bgcolor="#bbcaff"|All-Star Break
|- style="background:#cfc;"
|- bgcolor="#bbffbb"
|- align="center" bgcolor="#ffcccc"
| 51
| February 12, 1985
| @ Milwaukee
| L 103–111
|
|
|
| MECCA Arena
| 24–27
|- align="center" bgcolor="#ccffcc"
| 52
| February 13, 1985
| Cleveland
| W 112–105
|
|
|
| Brendan Byrne Arena
| 25–27
|- align="center" bgcolor="#ccffcc"
| 53
| February 15, 1985
| Detroit
| W 124–123
|
|
|
| Brendan Byrne Arena
| 26–27
|- align="center" bgcolor="#ccffcc"
| 54
| February 16, 1985
| @ New York
| W 126–117
|
|
|
| Brendan Byrne Arena
| 27–27
|- align="center" bgcolor="#ffcccc"
| 55
| February 20, 1985
| Utah
| L 104–110 (OT)
|
|
|
| Brendan Byrne Arena
| 27–28
|- align="center" bgcolor="#ffcccc"
| 56
| February 22, 1985
| Golden State
| L 127–131
|
|
|
| Brendan Byrne Arena
| 27–29
|- align="center" bgcolor="#ccffcc"
| 57
| February 23, 1985
| @ Detroit
| W 111–103
|
|
|
| Pontiac Silverdome
| 28–29
|- align="center" bgcolor="#ccffcc"
| 58
| February 27, 1985
| Atlanta
| W 114–91
|
|
|
| Brendan Byrne Arena
| 29–29

|- align="center" bgcolor="#ccffcc"
| 59
| March 1, 1985
| @ Washington
| W 100–98
|
|
|
| Capital Centre
| 30–29
|- align="center" bgcolor="#ccffcc"
| 60
| March 3, 1985
| @ Chicago
| W 117–113
|
|
|
| Chicago Stadium
| 31–29
|- align="center" bgcolor="#ffcccc"
| 61
| March 5, 1985
| @ Kansas City
| L 113–134
|
|
|
| Kemper Arena
| 31–30
|- align="center" bgcolor="#ccffcc"
| 62
| March 6, 1985
| Seattle
| W 129–108
|
|
|
| Brendan Byrne Arena
| 32–30
|- align="center" bgcolor="#ffcccc"
| 63
| March 8, 1985
| Portland
| L 110–128
|
|
|
| Brendan Byrne Arena
| 32–31
|- align="center" bgcolor="#ffcccc"
| 64
| March 10, 1985
| Dallas
| L 113–126
|
|
|
| Brendan Byrne Arena
| 32–32
|- align="center" bgcolor="#ffcccc"
| 65
| March 12, 1985
| @ Indiana
| L 108–109
|
|
|
| Market Square Arena
| 32–33
|- align="center" bgcolor="#ccffcc"
| 66
| March 13, 1985
| Washington
| W 114–109
|
|
|
| Brendan Byrne Arena
| 33–33
|- align="center" bgcolor="#ffcccc"
| 67
| March 16, 1985
| @ Philadelphia
| L 107–127
|
|
|
| The Spectrum
| 33–34
|- align="center" bgcolor="#ccffcc"
| 68
| March 17, 1985
| Indiana
| W 129–105
|
|
|
| Brendan Byrne Arena
| 34–34
|- align="center" bgcolor="#ffcccc"
| 69
| March 19, 1985
| @ Milwaukee
| L 111–130
|
|
|
| MECCA Arena
| 34–35
|- align="center" bgcolor="#ccffcc"
| 70
| March 20, 1985
| Cleveland
| W 128–108
|
|
|
| Brendan Byrne Arena
| 35–35
|- align="center" bgcolor="#ffcccc"
| 71
| March 22, 1985
| Denver
| L 111–123
|
|
|
| Brendan Byrne Arena
| 35–36
|- align="center" bgcolor="#ccffcc"
| 72
| March 26, 1985
| @ Atlanta
| W 109–108 (OT)
|
|
|
| Lakefront Arena
| 36–36
|- align="center" bgcolor="#ffcccc"
| 73
| March 27, 1985
| Boston
| L 95–105
|
|
|
| Brendan Byrne Arena
| 36–37
|- align="center" bgcolor="#ffcccc"
| 74
| March 29, 1985
| @ Washington
| L 98–122
|
|
|
| Capital Centre
| 36–38
|- align="center" bgcolor="#ccffcc"
| 75
| March 30, 1985
| @ New York
| W 123–114
|
|
|
| Madison Square Garden
| 37–38

|- align="center" bgcolor="#ffcccc"
| 76
| April 2, 1985
| @ Chicago
| L 94–108
|
|
|
| Chicago Stadium
| 37–39
|- align="center" bgcolor="#ccffcc"
| 77
| April 3, 1985
| New York
| W 113–100
|
|
|
| Brendan Byrne Arena
| 38–39
|- align="center" bgcolor="#ccffcc"
| 78
| April 6, 1985
| Milwaukee
| W 108–104
|
|
|
| Brendan Byrne Arena
| 39–39
|- align="center" bgcolor="#ffcccc"
| 79
| April 9, 1985
| @ Cleveland
| L 100–114
|
|
|
| Richfield Coliseum
| 39–40
|- align="center" bgcolor="#ccffcc"
| 80
| April 10, 1985
| Philadelphia
| W 125–100
|
|
|
| Brendan Byrne Arena
| 40–40
|- align="center" bgcolor="#ccffcc"
| 81
| April 13, 1985
| Chicago
| W 123–111
|
|
|
| Brendan Byrne Arena
| 41–40
|- align="center" bgcolor="#ccffcc"
| 82
| April 14, 1985
| @ Boston
| W 129–118
|
|
|
| Boston Garden
| 42–40

Playoffs

|- align="center" bgcolor="#ffcccc"
| 1
| April 18, 1985
| @ Detroit
| L 105–125
| Williams (23)
| Williams (9)
| Richardson (10)
| Joe Louis Arena10,465
| 0–1
|- align="center" bgcolor="#ffcccc"
| 2
| April 21, 1985
| @ Detroit
| L 111–121
| Williams (23)
| Williams (11)
| Richardson (14)
| Joe Louis Arena11,501
| 0–2
|- align="center" bgcolor="#ffcccc"
| 3
| April 24, 1985
| Detroit
| L 115–116
| Williams, King (28)
| Williams (12)
| Richardson (10)
| Brendan Byrne Arena9,999
| 0–3

Player statistics

Season

Playoffs

Awards and records

Transactions

References

See also
 1984–85 NBA season

New Jersey Nets season
New Jersey Nets seasons
New Jersey Nets
New Jersey Nets
20th century in East Rutherford, New Jersey
Meadowlands Sports Complex